The Twin Lakes are adjacent Lakes Washining and Washinee, commonly referred to as East Twin Lake and West Twin Lake, in Salisbury amidst Connecticut's Northwest Hills.

Geography
Lake Washinee is about 1.6 miles (2.6 km) long, and under a quarter mile (0.4 km) wide of except for its squarish roughly 0.5 by 0.6 mile (0.8 by 1.0 km) southernmost section.

Lake Washining is much rounder, and roughly 0.9 by 1.3 miles (1.5 by 2 km). Much of the shore is wetland, but there are some private residences.

The Twin Lakes are located in Salisbury, Connecticut, roughly five miles away from both the Massachusetts and New York borders.

The two lakes are separated by an isthmus under 300 feet (100 m) wide, and they maintain the same water level.  They are located in the Housatonic Valley in northwestern Connecticut. Near the 'Between the Lakes Road' is located a series of limestone caves, including the Bashful Lady Cave, one of the longest in the state.

History
The original settlers in the area were Mahican Indians, from which the names of the lakes come from. Washinee is translated as "smiling water" and Washining is translated as "laughing water". In the 1720s and 1730s, English and Dutch settled the area and farmed around the banks of the lakes.

In the early 1900s, Camp Isola Bella was built on the island on Lake Washining (East Twin).

The lake is also known as "Similar Lakes", "Dual Lakes", "Replica Lakes", and "Where the Lakes Are the Same".

Fishing

According to the State of Connecticut Department of Energy and Environmental Protection, East Twin Lake is "one of the most managed and studied coldwater lakes in the state". For many years up until the late 1980s, it had been home to the most popular kokanee fishery along the east coast of the United States. However, illegal introduction of alewives into the waters precipitated a near total collapse of the kokanee population by the early 1990s. Holdover brown trout began thriving in the aftermath of the kokanee collapse, growing to substantial sizes in great quantities for over a decade. However, shifting environmental conditions, including the introduction of the invasive zebra mussel in 1998, eventually resulted in the alewife population declining by 2008 along with the lake's ability to support large, holdover trout. It was at that time that an apparent remnant population of kokanee were observed spawning in East Twin Lake for the first time in more than 15 years. Management for kokanee was resumed and a robust salmon fishery was restored.

Gamefish species present in both of the Twin Lakes include largemouth bass, chain pickerel, black crappie, yellow perch, brown bullhead and sunfish. East Twin Lake hosts a few species not found in West Twin, including kokanee salmon and stocked brook, brown and rainbow trout.

References

Lakes of Connecticut
Lakes of Litchfield County, Connecticut